The Open International de Tennis de Roanne is a professional tennis tournament played on hard courts. It is currently part of the ATP Challenger Tour. It is held annually in Roanne, France since 2021.

Past finals

Singles

Doubles

References

ATP Challenger Tour
Hard court tennis tournaments
Tennis tournaments in France
Recurring sporting events established in 2021